Paolo Baronni was an Italian painter. His date of birth and death are not known.

Not much is known about Baronni's life. He is known primarily through records of his works. The Basilica of St Denis contains a trompe-l'œil painting done by Baronni around 1709.

References

18th-century Italian painters
Italian male painters
Italian muralists
Year of birth unknown
Year of death unknown
18th-century Italian male artists